Herman Johan Haugen (born 25 April 2000) is a Norwegian professional footballer who plays as a right-back for Viking FK.

Career
Haugen joined the academy of Viking FK from Hana IL at the age of 13. In 2019, he was loaned out to 2. divisjon club Vidar. On 6 February 2020, he signed a professional two-year contract with Viking, after impressing head coach Bjarne Berntsen and the rest of the coaching staff in pre-season. He spent most of the 2020 season on loan at 1. divisjon club Ull/Kisa, where he made 22 appearances. On 9 May 2021, he made his Eliteserien debut for Viking as a 76th-minute substitute in a 3–1 win against Brann. On 31 August 2021, he signed a two-year contract extension with Viking and simultaneously joined 1. divisjon club Raufoss on loan until the end of the season. The loan was extended in February 2022. In July 2022, he returned to his parent club Viking after they had sold another right-back, Sebastian Sebulonsen, to Brøndby IF.

Career statistics

References

External links
 Profile for Viking FK

2000 births
Living people
Norwegian footballers
FK Vidar players
Ullensaker/Kisa IL players
Viking FK players
Raufoss IL players
Norwegian Third Division players
Norwegian Second Division players
Norwegian First Division players
Eliteserien players
Association football defenders